Ryan Farrag (born 6 February 1988) is an English professional boxer. He held the European bantamweight title from 2015 to 2016 and challenged once for the British bantamweight title in 2016.

Professional career
On 30 October 2015 Farrag defeated Stephane Jamoye by ninth-round knockout (KO) to win the vacant European bantamweight title.

Professional boxing record

References

1988 births
Living people
English male boxers
Bantamweight boxers
European Boxing Union champions
Prizefighter contestants